Blasius M. D'Souza (22 February 1938 – 26 January 2008) was an Indian politician from Mangalore. A member of the Indian National Congress from Mangalore, he was the first Roman Catholic minister in the Karnataka state government.

Biography
Blasius D'Souza was the son of AR D'Souza, a prominent businessman in Mangalore. He studied at St. Aloysius College, Mangalore, from where he graduated with a B.Com. degree in 1959. At St. Aloysius, he was president of the College Students' Union and also a member of the hockey team. He earned his L.L.B. from Siddhartha Law College, Mumbai, in 1961. He had five children, Anoop, Rohit,  Sonia, Reema & Rovena. He hailed from the Mangalorean Catholic community.

Political career
Blasius D'Souza entered politics as a Mangalore City Council member in 1962 from Congress Party, where he served for 17 years.  For seven years from 1972 to 1979 he was the Council President. He served as a District Chairman of Congress Committee in Dakshina Kannada district. He was a Member of Legislative Council in Karnataka Legislature from 1980 to 1985 and represented Mangalore as a Member of Legislative Assembly for nine years. In the July 1991, he was appointed Law Minister of Karnataka in the Veerappa Moily government. He cleared an average of 25,00 files a month and created a record during his tenure as a minister. In November 1992, he was appointed Minister for Labour in a Cabinet Reshuffle, a position in which he served until 1994.

Death
Mr D'Souza died at 5:30 a.m. at the KMC hospital in Mangalore on 26 January 2008. His funeral was attended by Karnataka Congress leaders such as Veerappa Moily, Janardhana Poojary, B. Ramanath Rai, former ministers B. Nagaraja Shetty and B A Moideen, former MP Vinaykumar Sorake, local Congress leaders Ivan D'Souza and Naveen D'Souza among others. National politicians Oscar Fernandes and George Fernandes also attended.

Positions held

 Member of Legislative Council
 Member of Legislative Assembly
 Minister for Law
 Minister for Labour
 Member, Indian National Congress.
 President Students Union St. Aloysius College, Mangalore.
 Chairman, City Central Library, Mangalore.
 Senate Member, Mangalore University.
 Member, Karnataka Telecommunication Advisory Board.
 Vice-Chairman, Hind Kuhst Nivarana Sangha Mangalore.
 Chairman Board of Visitors Govt. Venlock Hospital, Mangalore.
 Member, Board of Visitors Lady Goschan Hospital, Mangalore.
 Member, Mangalore Port Trust, New Mangalore
 Member, Karnataka Administrative Reforms Commission.
 Member, Karnataka State Town and Country Planning Board, Bangalore.
 Member, Planning Authority, Mangalore.
 Founder, Patron Mangalore Wildlife Trust.
 Founder-Chairman Millions of Tree Club, Mangalore.
 Member, World Forestry Day Committee, New Delhi.
 Member, Karnataka State Board for prevention and Control of Water Pollution, Bangalore.
 Vice-Chairman, D.K. District Tuberculosis Assn. Mangalore.
 Member Governing Council, Fr. Muller's Charitable Institution, Mangalore.
 Founder President Mangalore Auto Rickshaw and Car Operators Co-operative Society, Mangalore.
 Executive Committee Member KPCC (I) from 1979 to 1982.
 President Dakshina Kannada DCC(I) from 1979 to 1992, 2001
 Member Organisation Election Committee for Orissa State 1999.
 Chairman, Membership Books Committee for Membership drive of the party in Karnataka 1999.
 Observer Goa Legislative Assembly Election 1999.
 Vice-President, Karnataka Pradesh Congress Committee (I) since 1998.
 Chairman, Pradesh Election Authority for Goa.
 Councillor Mangalore City Municipal Council 1962 to 1979
 President Mangalore City Municipal Council  1972 to 1979.
 President, Dakshina Kannada Hockey Association.
 Member Governing Board Fr. Muller's Hospital, Mangalore.
 Member, Governing Board St. Joseph's Engineering College, Mangalore.
 Chairman, Cheshire homes India, Mangalore Unit.
 Member, KPCC (I) and AICC (I).
 Member, Library Committee
 Member, Public Undertaking Committee
 Member, House Committee
 Member, SC/ST Committee
 Member, Public Accounts Committee
 Member, Managing Committee, SDM Law College, MG Road, Mangalore
 Deputy Leader of the Indian Delegation to the 81st Session of the International Labour Organisation held at Geneva during the Month of June, 1994.

References

External links
Obituary in The Hindu
Obituary in Manglorean.Com

1938 births
2008 deaths
Indian Roman Catholics
Mayors of Mangalore
Mangalorean Catholics
State cabinet ministers of Karnataka
Indian National Congress politicians from Karnataka
Members of the Karnataka Legislative Council
Karnataka MLAs 1985–1989
Karnataka MLAs 1989–1994